Jamieńszczyzna  is a village in the administrative district of Gmina Tarnogród, within Biłgoraj County, Lublin Voivodeship, in eastern Poland.

References

Villages in Biłgoraj County